Àlex Corretja and Luis Lobo were the defending champions but they competed with different partners that year, Corretja with Lucas Arnold and Lobo with Martín García.

García and Lobo lost in the first round to Joshua Eagle and Ben Ellwood.

Arnold and Corretja lost in the final 7–6(7–3), 6–4 against Robbie Koenig and Thomas Shimada.

Seeds
Champion seeds are indicated in bold text while text in italics indicates the round in which those seeds were eliminated. All eight seeded teams received byes to the second round.

Draw

Final

Top half

Bottom half

External links
 2002 Generali Open Doubles Draw

Austrian Open Kitzbühel
2002 ATP Tour